Sumter County School District or variations may refer to:
Sumter County School District (Georgia)
Sumter County School District (Alabama)
Sumter County School District (Florida)